Paul Dudley may refer to:
 Paul Dudley (jurist) (1675–1751), Attorney-General of the Province of Massachusetts Bay
 Paul Dudley (American football) (1939–1987), former American football defensive back and running back
 Paul Vincent Dudley (1926–2006), American prelate of the Roman Catholic Church

See also